Dreamer is the fifth album by Spanish singer Soraya Arnelas released in Spain on September 27, 2010, by Sony Music. It was her first album for the label and took six months to complete. Musically, it incorporates elements of Europop.

Track listing

Charts
Dreamer spent a total of 19 weeks on albums chart in Spain, peaking at number eight from sales in its first week of release.

References

2010 albums
Soraya Arnelas albums